Newport Arch is a 3rd-century Roman gate in the city of Lincoln, Lincolnshire. It is a Scheduled monument and Grade I listed building and is reputedly the oldest arch in the United Kingdom still used by traffic.

History 

The arch was remodelled and enlarged when the city, then Lindum Colonia a Roman town, became capital of the province Flavia Caesariensis in the 4th century. Though unique in the United Kingdom, it is nevertheless one of many original Roman arches still open to traffic, other examples being two gates through the city walls of the Roman town of Diocletianopolis (now Hisarya, Bulgaria), as well as numerous examples in Turkey.

As the north gate of the city, it carried the major Roman road Ermine Street northward almost in a straight line to the Humber.

From Romano-British Buildings and Earthworks by John Ward (1911): 
Its arch is of a single ring of large limestone voussoirs rising from imposts which appear to have been moulded. The outer or front arch has long since disappeared. On the west side there was a similar postern about a century ago. The whole structure is of good masonry, and it appears to have projected considerably beyond the north face of the town wall.

Accidents
In May 1964 a goods lorry belonging to the Humber Warehousing Company struck the arch while attempting to pass under it.

Forty years later, in May 2004, another lorry struck the arch, causing minor damage.

13 years later, in May 2017, a RASE logistics lorry got stuck underneath the arch; after letting down the tyres, it was able to reverse out with no apparent damage to the structure.

References

External links

Lindum: General information on Roman Lincoln and inscriptions 
Not resting on their laurels A survey of Lincoln's Roman heritage

Buildings and structures completed in the 3rd century
Buildings and structures in Roman Britain
Archaeological sites in Lincolnshire
Buildings and structures in Lincoln, England
Gates in England
Roman sites in England
Grade I listed buildings in Lincolnshire
Grade I listed gates
Ruins in Lincolnshire
History of Lincoln, England
Arches and vaults in England